Kris (meaning Crisis in English) was a culture magazine published in Sweden. It existed from 1975 to 1997.

History and profile
The magazine was established by Stig Larsson and Åke Sandgren in Umeå in 1975. It was first named CODE, and it was renamed as Kris in 1977. The magazine was published between 1977 and 1997 by Föreningen KRIS.

The magazine featured articles on critique, philosophy and aesthetics. Horace Engdahl and Anders Olsson were part of the editorial staff.

References

1975 establishments in Sweden
1997 disestablishments in Sweden
Cultural magazines
Defunct magazines published in Sweden
Magazines established in 1975
Magazines disestablished in 1997
Mass media in Umeå
Philosophy magazines
Swedish-language magazines